Hallelujah FC is a defunct South Korean football club. The club was officially founded on December 20, 1980 as the first professional football club in South Korea.

History
Hallelujah FC was founded by Choi Soon-young, president of the KFA at the time, in 1980. It consisted of Christian (Catholic or Protestant) footballers and coaches. Hallelujah FC won the inaugural Korea Super League title in 1983. After 1985, Hallelujah FC became an amateur club dedicated towards missionary work.

Hallelujah FC was dissolved in August 1998 due to the Asian financial crisis.

Honours

Domestic competitions

League
K League Classic
Winners (1): 1983

Cups
 National Football Championship
Runners-up (5): 1991, 1994, 1995, 1997, 1998
 President's Cup
Winners (1): 1988
Runners-up (1): 1994

International/Invitational
 Queen's Cup
Winners (1): 2009

Notable players
 Park Sang-In
 Lee Young-Moo
 Choi Jong-Duk

See also
 Goyang Hi FC

References

 
K League clubs
S
S
1980 establishments in South Korea
1998 disestablishments in South Korea
Christianity in Korea
Protestantism in Korea